André Gonçalves Dias (born 29 June 2001) is a Portuguese footballer who plays for Vilafranquense  as a midfielder.

Football career
He made his professional debut for Vilafranquense on 13 September 2020 in the Liga Portugal 2.

References

External links

2001 births
Living people
Footballers from Lisbon
Portuguese footballers
Association football midfielders
Liga Portugal 2 players
U.D. Vilafranquense players